Steffi Graf won in the final 6–4, 6–1 against Katerina Maleeva.

Seeds
A champion seed is indicated in bold text while text in italics indicates the round in which that seed was eliminated.

  Steffi Graf (champion)
  Helena Suková (semifinals)
  Lori McNeil (semifinals)
  Katerina Maleeva (final)
  Natasha Zvereva (quarterfinals)
  Nathalie Tauziat (quarterfinals)
  Patty Fendick (quarterfinals)
  Larisa Savchenko (second round)

Draw

References
 1988 U.S. Women's Hard Court Championships Draw

Women's Singles
Singles
Women's sports in Connecticut